The men's pole vault at the 2017 World Championships in Athletics was held at the Olympic Stadium on 6 and 8 August.

Summary
Of the twelve finalists, only three reached 5.75 metres without any fails: Olympic bronze medalist Sam Kendricks (USA), world record holder Renaud Lavillenie and Xue Changrui (China). Two Polish vaulters, Piotr Lisek and Paweł Wojciechowski, also cleared that height but with previous misses. Kendricks and Xue succeeded first time at 5.82 metres, while all the others passed after one failure to the next height, 5.89 metres. Kendricks and Lisek cleared that height on their first attempts, and Lavillenie on his last attempt, with Xue and Wojciechowski failing to clear that height and leaving the three medallists confirmed. All three were unsuccessful in their first two tries at 5.95 metres, and on the third try Kendrick succeeded, Lisek failed, and Lavillenie passed. Both Kendricks and Lavillenie failed at 6.01 metres, leaving Lavillenie with bronze and Kendricks with gold.

Records
Before the competition records were as follows:

The following records were set at the competition:

Qualification standard
The standard to qualify automatically for entry was 5.70 metres.

Schedule
The event schedule, in local time (UTC+1), was as follows:

Results

Qualification
The qualification round took place on 6 August, in two groups, both starting at 10:40. Athletes attaining a mark of 5.75 metres ( Q ) or at least the 12 best performers ( q ) qualified for the final. The overall results were as follows:

Final
The final took place on 8 August at 19:42. The results were as follows:

References

Notes

Pole vault
Pole vault at the World Athletics Championships